The men's middleweight competition of the boxing events at the 2013 Mediterranean Games in Mersin, Turkey, was held between June 21 and 26 at the Tarsus Arena.

Like all Mediterranean Games boxing events, the competition was a straight single-elimination tournament. Both semifinal losers were awarded bronze medals, so no boxers competed again after their first loss.

Schedule
All times are Eastern European Summer Time (UTC+3).

Results

Bracket

References

Boxing at the 2013 Mediterranean Games